Abbasabad (also Abas-Abad) is a village and municipality in the Yardymli Rayon of Azerbaijan.  It has a population of 596.  The municipality consists of the villages of Abbasabad and Solqard.

References

External links
Satellite map at Maplandia.com

Populated places in Yardimli District